Robert Tucker (March 24, 1857 - March 24, 1910) was a trainer of Thoroughbred racehorses best known for winning the 1905 Kentucky Derby and the Tennessee Derby with the colt Agile for owner Samuel S. Brown.

Among his other clients, Robert Tucker trained for Charles Fleischmann, founder of Fleischmann Yeast Company.

Robert Tucker died of heart failure in Louisville, Kentucky on his fifty-third birthday and was buried in Louisville's St. Louis Cemetery.

References

1857 births
1910 deaths
American horse trainers
People from Frankfort, Kentucky
Burials at St. Louis Cemetery, Louisville